Liga Deportiva Universitaria de Quito's 1981 season was the club's 51st year of existence, the 28th year in professional football and the 21st in the top level of professional football in Ecuador.

Kits
Supplier: AdidasSponsor(s): Banco Popular

Squad

Competitions

Serie A

First stage

Results

Second stage

Results

Liguilla Final

Results

2nd Place Playoff

Results

References
RSSSF - 1981 Serie A

External links
 
9 de Octubre (3) - LDU Quito (0)
Barcelona (2) - LDU Quito (1)

1981